International Superstar Soccer 3 (officially abbreviated as ISS3) is a football video game in the International Superstar Soccer series developed by the KCEO division of Konami. It is the final installment of the International Superstar Soccer series.

References

2003 video games
Europe-exclusive video games
GameCube games
International Superstar Soccer
PlayStation 2 games
Video games developed in Japan
Windows games